Krasnoyarsk Northeast was an air base in Russia located 4 km northeast of Krasnoyarsk.  The airfield was the western end of the ALSIB Alaska-Siberia air route for Lend-Lease aircraft during World War II including Bell P-39 Airacobras and North American B-25 Mitchells.  The former airfield has been converted into apartment complexes.  There was an Antonov An-2 maintenance facility, which is now gone.  It was a utilitarian airfield with An-2, An-24, and An-6 aircraft, probably now based at Krasnoyarsk Yemelyanovo Airport.

References

Soviet Air Force bases
Soviet Military Transport Aviation